"Take Your Memory with You" is a song written and recorded by American country music artist Vince Gill.  It was released in January 1992 as the fourth single from the album Pocket Full of Gold.  The song reached number 2 on the Billboard Hot Country Singles & Tracks chart.

Chart performance

Year-end charts

References

1992 singles
Vince Gill songs
Songs written by Vince Gill
Song recordings produced by Tony Brown (record producer)
MCA Records singles
1991 songs